In network science, the activity-driven model is a temporal network model in which each node has a randomly-assigned "activity potential", which governs how it links to other nodes over time. 

Each node  (out of  total) has its activity potential  drawn from a given distribution . All links are then deleted after each timestep.

For example, since each node  after  timesteps will have on average  outgoing links, the degree distribution after  timesteps in the time-aggregated network will be related to the activity-potential distribution by

 

Spreading behavior according to the SIS epidemic model was investigated on activity-driven networks, and the following condition was derived for large-scale outbreaks to be possible:

 

Extensions 

A variety of extensions to the activity-driven model have been studied. One example is activity-driven networks with attractiveness, in which the links that a given node forms do not attach to other nodes at random, but rather with a probability proportional to a variable encoding nodewise attractiveness. Another example is activity-driven networks with memory, in which activity-levels change according to a self-excitation mechanism.

References 

Random graphs